According to traditional Chinese uranography, the modern constellation Aries is located within the western quadrant of the sky, which is symbolized as the White Tiger of the West (西方白虎, Xī Fāng Bái Hǔ).

The name of the western constellation in modern Chinese is 白羊座 (bái yáng zuò), meaning "the white sheep constellation".

Stars
The map of Chinese constellation in constellation Aries area consists of:

See also
Chinese astronomy
Traditional Chinese star names
Chinese constellations

References

External links
Aries – Chinese associations
 香港太空館研究資源
 中國星區、星官及星名英譯表
 天象文學
 台灣自然科學博物館天文教育資訊網
 中國古天文
 中國古代的星象系統

Astronomy in China
Aries (constellation)